The Castilian (in Spanish El valle de las espadas) is a 1963 independently made biographical film drama in Eastmancolor, produced by Sidney W. Pink, directed by Javier Setó, that stars Cesar Romero, Frankie Avalon, Broderick Crawford, Alida Valli, Espartaco Santoni, Tere Velázquez, Fernando Rey, and Soledad Miranda. The Castilian was distributed in the U.S. by Warner Bros. Pictures. All of film's exteriors were shot in Burgos and Peñafiel (Valladolid), Spain.

The film's storyline concerns Fernán González of Castile, the first independent Count of Castile, who lived and reigned in the early 10th century. He is considered an important figure in the Spanish Reconquista.

Plot 
Don Sancho (Broderick Crawford) is a despotic 10th century castilian king who, in league with the invading Moors, has banished handsome Castilian nobleman Fernán González (Espartaco Santoni). With the surreptitious aid of Don Sancho's daughter, Sancha (Tere Velázquez), Fernán González assembles an army to march against the Moors.

Cast
 Cesar Romero as Jerónimo
 Frankie Avalon as Jerifán
 Broderick Crawford as Don Sancho
 Alida Valli as Reina Teresa
 Espartaco Santoni as Fernán González
 Tere Velázquez as Sancha
 Fernando Rey as Ramiro II of León
 Soledad Miranda as Maria Estevez

Production
The film was known during production as The Valley of the Swords. Linda Darnell was supposed to star in the film but had to bow out and was replaced by Alida Valli.

Comic book adaption
 Dell Movie Classic: The Castilian (January 1964)

See also
 list of historical drama films

References

External links
 
 
 

1960s historical films
Spanish historical films
1963 films
Films set in the 10th century
Films set in Spain
Spanish biographical films
Films directed by Javier Setó
Films adapted into comics
Films produced by Sidney W. Pink
1960s biographical films
English-language Spanish films
1960s English-language films
1960s Spanish films